Adelophryne gutturosa (common name: Guiana Shield frog) is a species of frogs in the family Eleutherodactylidae. It is found on the Guiana Shield from eastern Venezuela through Guyana to French Guiana and adjacent Brazil (Amapá), possibly extending to Suriname. Its type locality is Mount Roraima. Its local Spanish name is ranita guturosa.

Taxonomy
Recent molecular research suggests that A. gutturosa consists of more than one species.

Description
Adult males measure  and females  in snout–vent length. The snout is truncate. The head is slightly wider than the body. The tympanum is small but distinct. The canthus rostralis is indistinct. Females have a horizontal supra-tympanic fold. The fingers have asymmetrically pointed tips but no discs, whereas the toe tips have grooved, asymmetrically pointed discs. Skin is smooth. The dorsum is light brown and flanks are black. Males have large subgular vocal sac.

Habitat and conservation
Males call from the base of plants (often formations of Monotagma spicatum), hidden among rootlets and dead leaves.

This species is not common, although its secretive habits also make it difficult to find. No significant threats to it have been identified, and its range includes several national parks.

References

gutturosa
Amphibians of Brazil
Amphibians of French Guiana
Amphibians of Guyana
Amphibians of Venezuela
Amphibians described in 1984
Taxonomy articles created by Polbot
Taxa named by Marinus Steven Hoogmoed